is a city located in Niigata Prefecture, Japan. , the city had an estimated population of 28,495 in 10,821 households, and a population density of 110 persons per km2 (288/sq mi).

Geography
Tainai is located in northern Niigata Prefecture, bordered by Yamagata Prefecture to the east and the Sea of Japan to the west. The city area has an elongated shape from east to west along the Tainai River basin. There are number of dams in Tainai, including the Tainaigawa Dam and Tainai Dam.

Surrounding municipalities
Niigata Prefecture
Murakami
Shibata
Sekikawa
Yamagata Prefecture
Oguni

Climate
Tainai has a Humid climate (Köppen Cfa) characterized by warm, wet summers and cold winters with heavy snowfall.

Demographics
Per Japanese census data, the population of Tainai has declined over the past 50 years.

History

The area of present-day Tainai was part of ancient Echigo Province.  Following the Meiji restoration, the area was organized as part of Kitakanbara District, Niigata. The town of Nakajō, and the village of Kurokawa were established with the establishment of the modern municipalities system on April 1, 1889. The city of Tainai was established on September 1, 2005, from the merger of these municipalities.

Government

Tainai has a mayor-council form of government with a directly elected mayor and a unicameral city legislature of 14 members. Tainai contributes one member to the Niigata Prefectural Assembly. In terms of national politics, the city is part of Niigata 3rd district of the lower house of the Diet of Japan.

Economy
The economy of Tainai is primarily agricultural, mainly with rice cultivation, vegetables, flower cultivation, livestock farming, and fruit tree cultivation. Hydroelectric power generation also provides significant income to the local economy.

Education
Tainai has six public elementary schools and four public middle schools operated by the city government. The city has one public high school operated by the Niigata Prefectural Board of Education. There is also one private high school.

Transportation

Railway
 JR East - Uetsu Main Line
  -

Highway

Sister city relations
 - Carbondale, Illinois, USA

Local attractions

Tossaka Castle ruins, a National Historic Site
Jōnoyama Kofun, a National Historic Site
Oppo-ji, a Buddhist temple whose 3-story pagoda is a National Important Cultural Property

References

External links

Official Website 

Cities in Niigata Prefecture
Populated coastal places in Japan
Tainai, Niigata